Bryce Alman (born 19 January 1976 in North Dandenong, Victoria)  is an Australian Paralympic wheelchair rugby player.  He was part of the Australian Steelers at the 2000 Sydney, 2004 Athens and 2008 Beijing Paralympics, and won two silver medals with the team in 2000 and 2008.

References

Paralympic wheelchair rugby players of Australia
Wheelchair rugby players at the 2000 Summer Paralympics
Wheelchair rugby players at the 2004 Summer Paralympics
Wheelchair rugby players at the 2008 Summer Paralympics
Paralympic silver medalists for Australia
Living people
1976 births
Medalists at the 2000 Summer Paralympics
Medalists at the 2008 Summer Paralympics
Paralympic medalists in wheelchair rugby
Sportspeople from Melbourne
Sportsmen from Victoria (Australia)
People from Dandenong, Victoria